Goran Marić Govorcin (Serbian Cyrillic: Горан Mapић; born 23 March 1984) is a Serbian former footballer who played as a striker.

He spent most of his professional career in Spain, almost exclusively in the lower leagues with Celta de Vigo B.

Football career

Early years / Celta
Born in Novi Sad, Socialist Federal Republic of Yugoslavia, Marić moved to Spain in his teens, going on to play for three clubs as a youth, including FC Barcelona and RC Celta de Vigo. He made his senior debut with the latter's reserves and scored regularly for the Segunda División B side, notably netting 21 goals in 32 games in the 2007–08 season (best in his group, second overall); however, he only appeared once for the main squad in Segunda División, his output consisting of 30 minutes in a 1–2 home loss against CD Castellón on 2 February 2008.

In 2008–09, Marić was loaned to another team in the third level, FC Barcelona B. In June 2009, he was released by the Galicians.

Norwich City
Marić joined Norwich City on trial in the summer of 2009, touring with the club during its pre-season in Scotland and scoring twice in three matches, against Airdrie United and St Johnstone. Afterwards, manager Bryan Gunn confirmed he had been impressed well enough to offer the player a contract, with the one-year deal being signed on 30 July.

Marić made his official debut for the Canaries against Yeovil Town, for the campaign's Football League Cup, appearing as a substitute. His first start came in the 2009–10 Football League Trophy against Brentford (1–0 win) but he was almost always fifth-choice during his spell, behind the habitual Grant Holt and Chris Martin but also Jamie Cureton and Cody McDonald; subsequently, he left the side after his link was terminated by mutual consent, on 3 December 2009.

Return to Spain / Hungary
For the second part of 2009–10, Marić returned to Spain and its division two, signing with Real Unión. He appeared rarely during the season (less than one half of the league matches), also suffering team relegation.

Marić spent the better part of the following years in Hungary, in representation of Lombard-Pápa TFC.

Personal life
Marić's father, Zoran, was also a footballer and a striker. He too spent many years working in Spain, mainly with Celta.

References

External links

Celta de Vigo biography 

1984 births
Living people
Footballers from Novi Sad
Serbian footballers
Association football forwards
Segunda División players
Segunda División B players
Celta de Vigo B players
UD Las Palmas players
RC Celta de Vigo players
FC Barcelona Atlètic players
Real Unión footballers
Norwich City F.C. players
Nemzeti Bajnokság I players
Lombard-Pápa TFC footballers
Kazakhstan Premier League players
FC Zhetysu players
Serbian expatriate footballers
Expatriate footballers in Spain
Expatriate footballers in England
Expatriate footballers in Hungary
Expatriate footballers in Kazakhstan
Serbian expatriate sportspeople in Spain
Serbian expatriate sportspeople in England
Serbian expatriate sportspeople in Hungary
Serbian expatriate sportspeople in Kazakhstan